Amherst is an unincorporated community in Fergus County, in the U.S. state of Montana.

Big Spring Creek flows near town.

History
The community was named after Amherst, Massachusetts.

References

Unincorporated communities in Fergus County, Montana
Unincorporated communities in Montana